The Cork-Kerry rivalry is a Gaelic football rivalry between Irish county teams Cork and Kerry, who first played each other in 1889. It is considered to be one of the biggest rivalries in Gaelic games. Cork's home ground is Páirc Uí Chaoimh and Kerry's home ground is Fitzgerald Stadium, however, some of their championship meetings have been held at neutral venues, usually Croke Park.

While Kerry have the highest number of Munster titles and Cork are ranked second on the roll of honour, they have also enjoyed success in the All-Ireland Senior Football Championship, having won 44 championship titles between them to date.

Regarded as, possibly, the greatest rivalry of all in Gaelic football, a Munster final between Cork and Kerry, is regarded as a special occasion.

As of 2021 the sides have met 120 times in the championship including meeting twice at the All-Ireland final stage. Kerry won both of these games.

Roots

History

The Cork-Kerry rivalry can lay claim to be the greatest rivalry in Gaelic football.  As the nearest of neighbours these two teams are also the fiercest of rivals.  In spite of an almost annual meeting in the Munster Senior Football Championship, interest in the clash of these two teams has endured over the last 120 years.  Kerry are the most successful team in the history of the All-Ireland Senior Football Championship, leading the all-time roll of honour with thirty-five titles.  Cork, in comparison, have only won seven All-Ireland titles.

The rivalry began in 1889 when these two sides met in the championship for the first time.  Cork dominated the first decade, before Kerry found their niche.   A brief resurgence by Cork in the early years of the new century was followed by an unprecedented era of dominance by Kerry.  Between 1909 and 1943 Cork faced Kerry on sixteen different occasions and, unfortunately, they faced defeat in all of these games.

The 1940s saw Cork flourish for a brief period, before Kerry asserted their dominance once again.  Cork only claimed two victories over Kerry in the 1950s and 1960s, however, the rivalry intensified to unprecedented levels in the 1970s and 1980s. The early part of the 1970s saw Cork win three Munster titles in four years.  After winning the All-Ireland title in 1973 the county looked set for a few more years of dominance.  Kerry, however, bounced back with what has been described as the greatest team of all-time.  Kerry won twelve Munster titles between 1975 and 1986, defeating Cork on each occasion.  Cork's lone victory came in the 1983 provincial decider when they stopped Kerry from claiming a record nine-in-a-row.

In 1987 Cork broke the Kerry stranglehold at last and made hay while their biggest rivals were going through a transition.  Over the next nine years they won seven Munster titles and two All-Ireland titles.  The introduction of the qualifiers system in 2001 saw the launch of the Cork-Kerry rivalry on the national stage at Croke Park.  Although Cork have defeated Kerry in the provincial series of games on a number of occasions, Kerry have proved themselves to be the masters in the All-Ireland series, particularly in 2007 when Kerry trounced Cork in a unique all-Munster All-Ireland final.

Usually games are held in rotation on home soil between 2015 and 2017 played 3 times running at Fitzgerald Stadium, Killarney due to Páirc Uí Chaoimh, Cork been renovated. Between 2018 and 2020 meet 3 times running in Páirc Uí Chaoimh, Cork as to even out games. Very rare if the teams meet in unusual side of the draw was a Munster Quarter-final the teams usually meet in either a Munster Semi-final or Final. Only once since 1946 in 1992 they meet at the Quarter-final stage of the Munster championship the year Clare won the Munster title.

Statistics

Notable moments

Cork 0–2 : 0–1 Kerry (1889 at Mallow) – Not only was this the first clash in what would later become one of the greatest rivalries, but the game also marked Kerry's debut in the championship.  Several thousand spectators attended the game; however, the score was a low one. Kerry took a one-point lead at the interval, however, Cork fought back in the second-half without reward.  Cork leveled the game in the fourth quarter; however, both sides hit several wides.  With five minutes left ‘the Rebels’ secured a 0–2 to 0–1 lead.  Kerry had a number of chances to secure a draw, however, these were spurned.
Cork 2–3 : 0–9 Kerry (1943 at the Cork Athletic Grounds) – The 1940s saw Cork's footballing fortunes take a turn in the right direction.  One of the Munster semi-final paired Cork and Kerry, however, Kerry were still the overwhelming favourites.  Seven new players came into a Cork side that attacked the provincial kingpins from the off.  Cork had a 1–2 to 0–4 at the interval, however, it was not a true reflection of their superiority.  Kerry regrouped in the second period, however, a goal by Jim Cronin gave Cork a one-point lead in the dying stages of the game.  Kerry, however, equalised with a point to force a draw and a replay.
Cork 1–5 : 1–4 Kerry (1943 at the Cork Athletic Grounds) – After protracted negotiations the replay was fixed for Cork.  A bumper crowd flocked to the city to see the game.  Kerry recalled six players who had retired to bolster their chances in the replay.  Cork did not show the same superiority as they did in the drawn game, however, they were give plenty of opportunities to win after the interval.  Coming up to the long whistle Kerry were leading by two points, albeit against the run of play.  One of the Kerry full-backs failed to hold the ball in his own goalmouth, leading to a Cork attack which resulted in a goal.  This score gave Cork a 1–5 to 1–4 lead as the referee blew the final whistle.  There were great scenes of jubilation by the Cork contingent as it was their first victory over Kerry since the 1909 championship.  The Cork players were hailed as the heroes and were duly chaired off the field.
Cork 2–7 : 1–7 Kerry (17 July 1966 at FitzGerald Stadium) – In spite of some good performances Cork's victory over Kerry was a shock.  ‘The Kingdom’ had dominated the provincial series for the previous decade and were hoping to capture a record-breaking ninth Munster title in-a-row.  Cork got off to a shaky start, however, they got well on top in the second period of play.  The introduction of veteran Niall FitzGerald, who had scored the winning point in Cork's last victory over Kerry nine years earlier, proved a match winner.
Cork 5–12 : 1–15 Kerry (15 July 1973 at the Cork Athletic Grounds) – Despite inclement weather conditions up to 29,000 people thronged the Athletic Grounds for the last big game to be player there before its demolition.  The game was not long in progress when it became obvious that Cork were heading for a rare rout. Five quick goals in the first forty minutes gave ‘the Rebels’ a merited 5–4 to 0–6 lead at the interval.  Kerry launched a great comeback in the second-half; however, the gap could not be bridged as Cork won by 5–12 to 1–15.  A first All-Ireland title in twenty-eight years later followed.
Cork 3–10 : 3–9 Kerry (17 July 1983 at Páirc Uí Chaoimh) – After losing the famous five-in-a-row final to Offaly in 1982, Kerry were out to atone.  Furthermore, they were out to set a new record by becoming the first team to win nine Munster titles in-a-row.  In one of the great games between these two sides neither side took an extensive lead.  As the game entered injury time Kerry were leading by two points.  A dramatic last-minute goal by Tadhg Murphy gave Cork a merited 3–10 to 3–9 win.  The game was a personal triumph for Dinny Allen who, after losing eight consecutive provincial deciders to Kerry, finally collected a winners' medal at the ninth attempt.
Cork 2–7 : 1–10 Kerry (26 July 1987 at Páirc Uí Chaoimh) – Kerry were aiming to continue their dominance of the football world by claiming a twelfth Munster title in fourteen years.  Furthermore, Kerry were on the quest for a second four-in-a-row of All-Ireland titles inside a decade.  Cork, however, held a narrow lead for much of the game and were very much in control.  Mikey Sheehy squeezed in a goal to give Kerry a one-point lead just on the stroke of seventy minutes.  John Kerins's kick-out found John Cleary who kept possession before relaying to Christy Ryan.  The resultant free was converted by Larry Tompkins, thus securing a draw.
Cork 0–13 : 1–5 Kerry (2 August 1987 at FitzGerald Stadium) – A replay of the drawn Munster final and the end of an era for the greatest Gaelic football team of all-time.  Cork established an early superiority and, in spite of playing against the wind, 'the Rebels' were eight points to the good at the interval.  Kerry fought back in the second-half, however, there was never any doubt about the result.  Cork were the winners with five points to spare and ended Kerry's hopes of a second four-in-a-row inside a decade.
Cork 2–23 : 1–11 Kerry (1 July 1990 at Páirc Uí Chaoimh) – The annual Munster final saw Cork paired with Kerry once again.  Kerry's fortunes had taken a nosedive since the heady days of the late 1970s and early 1980s, as Cork were now the kingpins of provincial football.  This was best exemplified in the fact that Cork were aiming to capture a personal record of four Munster titles in-a-row.  ‘The Rebels’ were severely hampered from the beginning as six regular players were on the injured list.  The team that was picked showed their class and inflicted an unprecedented fifteen-point defeat on Kerry.  The four-in-a-row was secure and an historic double would soon follow.
Kerry 3–19 : 2–7 Cork (25 August 2002 at Croke Park) – An historic game in a rivalry that has been littered with historic games.  While Cork and Kerry had been used to doing battle in Cork or Killarney, this was the first time that the sides had met in Croke Park, the headquarters of the GAA.  Cork had earlier defeated Kerry after a replay before taking the Munster title after a replay as well.  This game, in spite of all its promise, was a rout.  Kerry trounced Cork by fifteen points.
Kerry 3–13 : 1–9 Cork (16 September 2007 at Croke Park) – An historic all-Munster All-Ireland final, contested by possibly the two biggest rivals in the championship.  Kerry, playing in a fourth championship decider in-a-row, were going for a second consecutive win, a feat last achieved by Cork in 1990.  Kerry had narrowly beaten Cork in the Munster final earlier in the year, resulting in high expectations from a Cork viewpoint.  While the first half was played on an even keel, 'the Kingdom' ran riot in the second half and a rout ensued. In a disastrous day for Cork football 'the Rebels' were trounced by 3–13 to 1–9.

All-time results

Legend

Senior

Records

Scorelines

 Biggest championship win:
 For Cork: Cork 2-23 - 1-11 Kerry, Munster final, Páirc Uí Chaoimh, 1 July 1990
 For Kerry: Kerry 4-22 - 1-09 Cork, Munster final, Fitzgerald Stadium, 25 July 2021
 Highest aggregate:
 Kerry 3-20 - 2-19 Cork, Munster final replay, Páirc Uí Chaoimh, 25 July 1976

References

Kerry
Kerry county football team rivalries